Seyni N'Diaye (born 6 September 1973) is a retired Senegalese football striker who formerly played with AEL FC in Cyprus. He played in England for Tranmere Rovers and in Scotland for Dunfermline. At Dunfermline he scored once against Kilmarnock.

Clubs
1998-1999:   Neuchâtel Xamax
1999-2001:  SM Caen
2001-2002:  Tranmere Rovers F.C.
2002-2002:  Dunfermline Athletic F.C.
2002-2004:  AEL FC
2004-2005:  Kerkyra FC
2005-2006:  AC Omonia
2006-2007:  Nea Salamina
2007-2008:  AEL FC

References

 footballplus.com

1973 births
Living people
Senegalese footballers
Senegalese expatriate footballers
Neuchâtel Xamax FCS players
Stade Malherbe Caen players
Tranmere Rovers F.C. players
Dunfermline Athletic F.C. players
A.O. Kerkyra players
Nea Salamis Famagusta FC players
AC Omonia players
AEL Limassol players
Scottish Premier League players
Super League Greece players
Cypriot First Division players
Expatriate footballers in Cyprus
Expatriate footballers in Greece
Expatriate footballers in Switzerland
Expatriate footballers in Scotland
Expatriate footballers in England
Expatriate footballers in France
Senegalese expatriate sportspeople in England
Senegalese expatriate sportspeople in Scotland
Association football forwards